Ole Kristian Hafnor (15 April 1882 – 5 August 1962) was a Norwegian factory owner, newspaper editor and politician.

He was born in Modum to wheelmaker Christen Nilsen Hafnor and Anna Dorthea Jensdatter. From 1910 to 1922 he was running a lorry factory in Solum. He was chief editor of the newspaper Telemark Arbeiderblad from 1926 to 1928. He was elected representative to the Storting for the period 1928–1930, for the Labour Party. He died in 1962.

References

1882 births
1962 deaths
People from Modum
Politicians from Skien
Labour Party (Norway) politicians
Members of the Storting
Norwegian newspaper editors